Boston, Massachusetts, is home to several major professional sports franchises. They include the Red Sox (baseball), the Celtics (basketball, in the state where the sport was invented), and the Bruins (ice hockey). The New England Patriots (American football) and the New England Revolution (soccer, or association football) play at Gillette Stadium in nearby Foxborough, Massachusetts. 

Several Boston-area colleges and universities are also active in college athletics including: Boston College, Boston University, Northeastern, and Harvard. The city is also home to prestigious sports events such as the Boston Marathon and the Head of the Charles Regatta.

Sports are a major part of the city's culture (as well as the culture of the Greater Boston area). Boston sports fans are known for their fanatical devotion to the Red Sox and knowledge of the team's history. However, in recent memory Boston is now known as an American football town, as the Patriots have long seized the title as the most popular team in New England, according to surveys. Fenway Park, home of the Red Sox, is the oldest ballpark in Major League Baseball (MLB) and holds a legendary status among baseball fans. Within the same era, what is now the world's oldest existing indoor multi-sports facility – today's Matthews Arena, primarily used by Northeastern University's college sports teams – first opened in 1910, only some 400 meters (1/4 mile) away from the original home field of the Red Sox – and is where on December 1, 1924, the Boston Bruins played their first NHL regular season game.

The Greater Boston region is the only city/surrounding area in American professional sports in which all facilities are privately owned and operated. The Patriots and Revolution both own Gillette Stadium, the Red Sox own Fenway Park, and TD Garden is owned by Delaware North, owner of the Bruins. The Celtics rent TD Garden from Delaware North.

Major league professional teams

Current teams

Former teams

Major league professional championships

Boston Red Sox (MLB) 
9 World Series titles
1903
1912
1915
1916
1918
2004
2007
2013
2018

Boston Braves (MLB) 

1 World Series title

1914

New England Patriots (NFL) 
6 Super Bowl titles
2001 (XXXVI)
2003 (XXXVIII)
2004 (XXXIX)
2014 (XLIX)
2016 (LI)
2018 (LIII)

Boston Celtics (NBA) 
17 NBA Finals titles
1957
1959
1960
1961
1962
1963
1964
1965
1966
1968
1969
1974
1976
1981
1984
1986
2008

Boston Bruins (NHL) 
6 Stanley Cup titles
1929
1939
1941
1970
1972
2011

New England Whalers (WHA) 
1 Avco World Trophy
1973

21st century sporting success

Since the turn of the century, Boston's professional sports teams have won 12 championships: six by the Patriots (Super Bowls XXXVI (2001), XXXVIII (2003), XXXIX (2004), XLIX (2014), LI (2016), and LIII (2018)), four by the Red Sox (and ) and one each by the Celtics and the Bruins (2011) respectively. Their sports teams have also appeared an additional 12 times as league finalists: five by the Revolution (2002, 2005, 2006, 2007, and 2014), three by the Patriots (Super Bowls XLII (2007), XLVI (2011), and LII (2017)), two by the Bruins (2013, and 2019) and two by the Celtics ( and ). The recent sporting success of their teams has given rise to the city's monicker as the "City of Champions", and "Titletown".

In the 2000s, Boston's professional teams had what was argued to be the most successful decade in sports history, winning six championships (three by the Patriots, two by the Red Sox, and one by the Celtics), while also appearing an additional five times as league finalists (four by the Revolution, one by the Patriots).

In the 2010s, their professional teams rivaled their 2000s achievements, winning six additional championships (three by the Patriots, two by the Red Sox, and one by the Bruins), while also appearing an additional six times as league finalists (two by the Patriots, two by the Bruins, one by the Celtics, and one by the Revolution).

When the Bruins won the 2011 Stanley Cup Finals, the city of Boston became the first city in the 21st century to have at least four of its major professional league teams win a league championship, and became the only city to ever have championships in four major professional leagues within a ten-year span, accomplishing this feat in a span of six years, four months, and nine days (from the Patriots' championship win on February 6, 2005 to the Bruins' championship win on June 15, 2011). Los Angeles would accomplish this same feat in 2022. This sporting achievement was what Dan Shaughnessy of Sports Illustrated dubbed as Boston completing the "Grand Slam of North American sports."
As of January 2023, at least one of Boston's four major pro sports teams has played in the final four of their respective sports playoffs, MLB'sALCS, NFL's AFC Championship Game, or the Eastern Conference Finals in the NBA and NHL, in every year since 2010.

Since 2002, DUKWs (aka "duck boats") provided by Boston Duck Tours have been used as Boston's championship parade vehicles, starting with the New England Patriots after the Patriots won Super Bowl XXXVI over the St. Louis Rams. As a result of this recent practice, the catch phrase "cue the duck boats" has been utilized whenever a Boston sports team has won a championship in advance of its celebratory parade. While much of the parade routes over the years consisted of the duck boats staying on land, some featured them traversing both the land and across the Charles River.

Soccer

According to American folklore, Pilgrim fathers observed a form of soccer called pasuckuakohowog that was played by Native Americans along the Massachusetts coast as early as 1620, the earliest observance of soccer of any form in what is currently the United States.

In 1862, The Oneida Football Club in Boston was the first organized team to play any kind of "football/soccer" in the United States. It was founded by Gerrit Smith "Gat" Miller, a graduate of the Latin School of Epes Sargent Dixwell, a private college preparatory school in Boston, who grew tired of the chaotic, disorganized, and very violent games that arose from different schools, as well as the rule variations of soccer that existed as a by-product of no formal rules for the game during that era. Miller organized other recent preparatory school graduates from relatively elite public (state) schools in the area, such as Boston Latin School and the English High School of Boston to join this team that played their games at Boston Common. Between 1862–65, playing against other pickup teams within Boston's collegiate community, the Oneidas never lost a match. Like American football historians, soccer historians trace the origins of their sport in the region to the Oneida Football Club and their brand of football that they played called the "Boston Game", which was a hybrid of both sports today that featured a rounded ball that could be kicked, carried, and thrown. The Boston game would go on to be introduced to Yale University, Columbia University, Cornell University, and Boston's Harvard University. This hybrid form of football, that would evolve into what is now American football, would eventually adopt codified rules based primarily on those established for English rugby, gained prominence and acceptance within the college circles, and upper-class status, relegating the uncodified "soccer" variety of the game to working-class status, that was adopted by the immigrant communities that brought along their soccer customs and traditions with them to the region.

In 1923, the world’s first indoor soccer league with 11-a-side teams on a full-sized field opened the winter season at the Commonwealth Calvary Armory in Boston.

In 1924, the Boston Soccer Club was formed and played in the professional American Soccer League, which comprised teams based in the northeastern U.S. region. The team was later renamed the Boston Bears in 1929 and played for an additional few seasons before the league folded in 1933 due to the Great Depression in the United States.

At the inaugural FIFA World Cup in 1930, Bert Patenaude (from Fall River, Massachusetts) scored the first hat-trick in World Cup play. The USMNT finished in third place.

1967 brought about the birth of nationwide professional soccer featuring two competing leagues. Of the two, Boston only played in the United Soccer Association and was represented by the Boston Rovers, whose roster was composed of players from Shamrock Rovers F.C. from the League of Ireland as well as guest players. They played their home matches at the Manning Bowl in Lynn, Massachusetts. In 1968, the United Soccer Association and the National Professional Soccer League merged to become the FIFA-backed, major professional North American Soccer League (NASL). Boston was represented that year by the Boston Beacons who played their lone season at Fenway Park. In 1974–76, Boston was represented in the league by the Boston Minutemen who played their home games in various stadiums within Greater Boston, including Nickerson Field and Foxboro Stadium. From 1978–80, Greater Boston was represented in the league by the New England Tea Men who played out of Foxboro Stadium. The team would relocate to Jacksonville, Florida after three seasons.

After the NASL folded on March 28, 1985, a new nationwide professional soccer league would re-emerge in 1996 in the form of Major League Soccer (MLS) following the success of the 1994 FIFA World Cup (with Foxboro Stadium as one of nine venues). Greater Boston would be represented by the New England Revolution, who play all their home games in Foxborough, Massachusetts. Gillette Stadium has served as the Revolution's current home stadium since 2002. The club's nickname "Revolution" refers to the New England region's significant involvement in the American Revolutionary War that took place from 1775 to 1783. The Revolution have participated in five MLS Cup finals in 2002, 2005, 2006, 2007, and 2014, but have not yet won. They won the 2021 MLS Supporters' Shield for the best regular season record.

Notable footballers who played in Boston include Portuguese legend Eusébio, and U.S. national team members: Taylor Twellman, Clint Dempsey, Alexi Lalas, and Billy Gonsalves (a native of Fall River, Massachusetts and was nicknamed the "Babe Ruth of American Soccer" during his career).

Basketball
The Boston Celtics basketball team, who play at the TD Garden, were a founding member of the Basketball Association of America, one of the two leagues that merged to form the National Basketball Association (NBA). The Celtics, along with rivals the Los Angeles Lakers, have the distinction of having more Championships than any other NBA team, with seventeen championships from 1957 to 2008.   They had a remarkable run of titles from the 1956–57 until the 1968–69 seasons, winning 11 of 13 championships in that span, including an NBA record 8 titles in a row from 1958–59 until 1965–66, under legendary center Bill Russell.

The list of Celtics who are members of the Basketball Hall of Fame include, among others, Bill Russell, Bob Cousy, John Havlicek, Dave Cowens, Larry Bird, Sam Jones, Nate Archibald, original owner Walter Brown, and longtime coach and team president Red Auerbach, who worked for the team until his death in 2006 at age 89. Longtime announcer Johnny Most was also honored by the Basketball Hall of Fame as a recipient of the Curt Gowdy Media Award. After finishing with a record of 24–58 in 2006–07, the team acquired Ray Allen and Kevin Garnett from the Seattle SuperSonics and Minnesota Timberwolves, respectively, to aid longtime Celtics star Paul Pierce make up one of the best defensive and offensive lineups in NBA history. With help of up-and-coming Rajon Rondo, Kendrick Perkins, and head coach Doc Rivers the team once again made history by winning the 2008 NBA Finals and their 17th championship against long-time rivals the Lakers.

One of the most notable athletes from Greater Boston was Hall of Famer Patrick Ewing who grew up in Cambridge, Massachusetts and attended the Cambridge Rindge and Latin School. Ewing won Olympic gold medals as a member of the 1984 and 1992 U.S. men's basketball teams and was selected as one of the 50 Greatest Players in NBA History in 1996 and as one of the 75 Greatest Players in NBA History in 2021.

Ice hockey

The TD Garden, above North Station, is the home to the Boston Bruins ice hockey team of the National Hockey League (NHL). The Bruins, founded in 1924, were the first American member of the NHL and an Original Six franchise, and have won six Stanley Cups, the latest being in 2011, where they defeated the Vancouver Canucks in seven games. The Bruins' first venue —  the only one of the Original Six teams to have its original venue still in existence — was the former Boston Arena on Huntington Avenue, having been built in 1910 under that name and now exists as Northeastern University's Matthews Arena, which is also the oldest purpose-built indoor ice hockey arena still in use in the world for the sport, used for Northeastern Huskies collegiate ice hockey and basketball in the 21st century.

Hall of Fame players such as forward Milt Schmidt, and defensemen Eddie Shore, Raymond Bourque and the legendary Bobby Orr have played for the Bruins, as well as the NHL's tallest-ever player, Slovakian-born defenseman Zdeno Chára, the former captain of the Bruins. The team has been managed/coached by Hall of Famers such as team founder Charles Adams (namesake of hockey's old Adams Division), Art Ross (donor and namesake of the NHL's trophy for annual scoring champion), Walter A. Brown, Schmidt and Harry Sinden. Orr was voted the greatest athlete in Boston history in the Boston Globe newspaper's poll of New Englanders in 1975, beating out baseball and basketball stars such as Ted Williams, Bill Russell, Carl Yastrzemski and Bob Cousy.

Since their initial meeting on December 8, 1924, the longest-standing rivalry in the NHL is the one between the Bruins and their Canadian archrival, the Montreal Canadiens, as these two teams have met 34 times in the NHL's Stanley Cup playoffs, with Montreal taking 18-straight playoff series from the Bruins between 1946 and 1987.

Boston's local colleges are also very strong in hockey. Boston College and Boston University are always competitive and at the top of the college rankings, both competing in the Hockey East conference. In the past ten years, Boston College has won three national championships (2008, 2010 and 2012) and Boston University has won one (2009). BC and BU, along with the Northeastern Huskies, also of Hockey East, and the Harvard Crimson of ECAC Hockey, compete in the Beanpot, considered the most prestigious in-season collegiate hockey tournament. It is played on the first two Mondays of February at TD Garden, with the semifinal matchups rotating on a year-to-year basis.

Baseball

The Boston Red Sox are a founding member of the American League of Major League Baseball (MLB), and one of the four American League teams (the White Sox, Guardians, and Tigers are the others) to still play in their original city. The "BoSox", or "Sox" as they are colloquially called, play their home games at Fenway Park, located near Kenmore Square, in the Fenway section of Boston. Built in 1912, it is the oldest sports arena or stadium in active use in the United States among the four major professional sports.
Boston was also the site of the first game of the first baseball World Series, in 1903. The Boston-New York baseball rivalry has existed since May 7, 1903: the Red Sox-Yankees rivalry, with the New York team then being known as the "Highlanders", from their Upper Manhattan home field location. The 1903 World Series was played between the Red Sox (then known as the "Americans") and the Pittsburgh Pirates, while the team still played at the Huntington Avenue Grounds (the site is now a part of Northeastern University). The Sox won that series and eight more since then (1912, 1915, 1916, 1918, 2004, 2007, 2013, and 2018). The 2004 team is said to have broken the 86-year-long "Curse of the Bambino." There have been many legendary players on the team including Cy Young, Babe Ruth, Ted Williams, Carl Yastrzemski, Carlton Fisk, Wade Boggs, Jim Rice, Pedro Martínez, Roger Clemens, and David Ortiz.

For the first half of the 20th century, Boston had two Major League Baseball franchises. The Boston Braves, operated in the National League from 1871 to 1952 before relocating to Milwaukee, and finally moving to their current home, Atlanta. They played their home games at South End Grounds (1871–1914) and Braves Field (1915–1952). In 1914, the Braves performed one of the most memorable comebacks in major league history, going from last place to first place in two months, becoming the first team to win a pennant after being in last place on the Fourth of July. The Braves went on to sweep Connie Mack's heavily favored Athletics in four games in the 1914 World Series. The franchise is the oldest continuous professional sports franchise.

American football

The Boston game
The Boston Game is thought to be the origin of American football, played by New England prep schools. In 1855, manufactured inflatable balls were introduced. These were much more regular in shape than the handmade balls of earlier times, making kicking and carrying more skillful. Two competing versions had evolved during this time; the "kicking game" which resembled soccer and the "running" or "carrying game" which resembled rugby union.  hybrid of the two, known as the "Boston game", was played by a group known as the Oneida Football Club. The club, considered by some historians as the first formal football club in the United States, was formed in 1861 by schoolboys who played the "Boston game" on Boston Common. They played mostly among themselves early on; though they organized a team of non-members to play a game in November 1863, which the Oneidas won easily. The game caught the attention of the press, and the "Boston game" continued to grow throughout the 1860s.

Early professional football

The first professional National Football League (NFL) franchise in the city was the Boston Bulldogs, who only played a single season (in 1929) since relocating from Pottsville, Pennsylvania.

The Boston Braves were established in 1932, under the ownership of George Preston Marshall. At the time the team played in Braves Field, home of the Boston Braves baseball team in the National League. The following year, the club moved to Fenway Park, home of the American League's Boston Red Sox, whereupon owners changed the team's name to "Boston Redskins." To round out the change, Marshall hired William "Lone Star" Dietz, who was thought to be part Sioux, as the team's head coach. However, Boston wasn't much of a football town at the time and the team had difficulty drawing fans. In fact, the 1936 NFL Championship Game was moved to the Polo Grounds in New York City due to apathy and low support in Boston. In 1937, Marshall moved the franchise to Washington, D.C.

In 1944, the Boston Yanks were established (the 3rd NFL franchise in Boston's history), playing their home games at Fenway Park and competing until 1948. The Yanks are the only officially defunct NFL team ever to have the first overall NFL draft pick. They had it twice, in 1944 and 1946. Both times they selected a quarterback from the University of Notre Dame: Angelo Bertelli (1944) and Frank Dancewicz (1946), both Massachusetts natives. Owner Ted Collins moved his "defunct" Yanks franchise to New York City in 1949, where it continued for one year as the Bulldogs and two years known as the New York Yanks.

Modern professional football

In 1959, Boston business executive Billy Sullivan was awarded a franchise (Boston Patriots) in the American Football League (AFL), bringing professional football back to Boston. Throughout the 1960s, the team lacked a permanent home field, playing at Nickerson Field (at the time still known and configured as Braves Field), Fenway Park, Harvard Stadium, and Boston College's Alumni Stadium. In 1970, the AFL merged with the NFL and the Patriots joined the league (the AFL- NFL merger was announced in 1966, the first season of Super Bowl competition).The following year, the franchise was re-named the New England Patriots. From 1971–2002, the team played at Foxboro Stadium in the town of Foxborough, Massachusetts which is located 22 miles (45 km) southwest of Boston. The 2002 season brought the opening of Gillette Stadium, located next door to Foxboro Stadium.

Businessman Robert Kraft, who at the time owned Foxboro Stadium and the team's lease for it, purchased the team in 1994 for $175 million, ensuring the Patriots would remain in New England amid a shuffle of owners and rumors of a relocation to St. Louis. The team experienced a recent surge of success, mostly with the turn of the century. The team has made 11 Super Bowl appearances and won six of them (XXXVI (2001), XXXVIII (2003), XXXIX (2004), XLIX (2014), LI (2016), LIII (2018)) and became the only team to go 16–0 in the regular season (in 2007) since the NFL expanded to a 16-game schedule in 1978. Notable people among the team include head coach Bill Belichick and star quarterback Tom Brady, who among others would help make the Patriots consistently successful.

Rugby union
Rugby in Boston has a strong following; the city is home to numerous amateur, college and semi-professional sides. The city has three teams in the former premier division of USA rugby union, the Rugby Super League – Mystic River Rugby Club, the Boston Irish Wolfhounds, and Boston RFC.  The current top flight of the sport, Major League Rugby, has the Boston-based New England Free Jacks who joined the league in 2020.

Rugby league
The Boston 13s founded in 2009, play in the North Conference of the USA Rugby League, they won the USARL National Championship in 2015.

Other sports teams

Boston is home to three professional lacrosse teams, including the Boston Cannons of Major League Lacrosse, who play at Harvard University's Harvard Stadium. The National Lacrosse League team in Boston is the Boston Blazers, who began in the 2009 season and play at the TD Garden.  The Boston Storm, who began in the 2016 season, is one of the original four teams of the United Women's Lacrosse League.

Two different women's soccer teams known as the Boston Breakers have been charter members of three separate professional leagues. The original version, founded in 2001, played in the short-lived Women's United Soccer Association. The Breakers were resurrected in 2009 to play in WUSA's equally short-lived successor, Women's Professional Soccer (WPS). After WPS folded following its 2011 season, the Breakers remained in operation, playing the 2012 season in the newly established semi-pro WPSL Elite. In December 2012, the Breakers were announced as one of the eight charter teams of the new National Women's Soccer League, which began play in 2013. While the WUSA and WPS Breakers played at Harvard Stadium, the NWSL team played its first season at the smaller Dilboy Stadium in Somerville. The NWSL Breakers moved to Harvard Stadium for the 2014 season, and then moved to the nearby venue now known as Jordan Field, where they remained until their demise after the 2017 season.

There have been other professional sports teams to play in the city, such as the Boston Beacons and Boston Minutemen of the NASL. Boston's first all-female flat-track roller derby league, Boston Derby Dames, formed in May 2005. The league is among the original members of the Women's Flat Track Derby Association.

College sports

Boston's many colleges and universities are active in college athletics. There are four NCAA Division I members in the city: Boston College (member of the Atlantic Coast Conference), Boston University (Patriot League), Northeastern University (Colonial Athletic Association), and Harvard University (Ivy League).

All except Harvard, which belongs to ECAC Hockey, belong to the Hockey East conference in hockey. The hockey teams of these four universities meet every year in a four-team tournament known as the "Beanpot Tournament", played at the TD Garden (and the Boston Garden before that) over two Monday nights in February.

The oldest continuously used indoor and outdoor sports stadium in the world are used by Boston schools: Harvard Stadium (built in 1903) and the aforementioned Boston Arena (now known as Matthews Arena, built in 1910), which is used by Northeastern University.

The University of Massachusetts-Amherst, located in the Western part of the state but heavily attended by Bostonians, also won a National Championship in Football on 12/19/1998.  The Massachusetts Minutemen (Hockey East) also won the NCAA Division I Ice Hockey championship on 4/10/2021.

Amateur and participatory sports
Boston has amateur and participatory sports and recreation.
The 18 mile loop through the Paul Dudley White Bicycle Path runs on both sides of the river within the Charles River Reservation for bicyclists and runners. Boston is also home is the oldest continuously operating community sailing program in the United States. It is located in Boston along the Charles River Esplanade between the Longfellow Bridge and the Hatch Shell.
Community Boating, Inc offers members instruction for sailing and windsurfing, and allows members to use CBI-owned sailboats on the Charles River. The Boston Ski and Sports Club offers team sports leagues in Basketball, Ultimate, Dodgeball, Football, Tennis, Volleyball, Golf, and other indoor and outdoor sports.

Events

The city is home to the Boston Marathon, one of the best known sporting events in the city. It is a  run from Hopkinton to Copley Square in the Back Bay and the world's oldest annual marathon, running on Patriots' Day in April.

The city is home to the Head of the Charles Regatta. Longwood Cricket Club (despite its name) is the oldest tennis club in the New World, located in Chestnut Hill. It is the site of the first Davis Cup competition.
Boston is the start and finish for the Boston–Montreal–Boston cycling event.

Boston's TD Garden is expected to host the 2020 Laver Cup, an international men's tennis tournament between two teams (Team World vs Team Europe). John McEnroe and Bjorn Borg will reprise their roles as captains in this fourth edition of the tournament.

In January 2015, the city was picked by the United States Olympic Committee to represent the nation in the bidding for the 2024 Olympic Games. But seven months later, the city withdrew itself from consideration amid concerns of the financial burdens associated with hosting the Olympics. Los Angeles was then selected as the US candidate and was ultimately awarded the right to host the 2028 Summer Olympics.

Boston is one of the eleven U.S. host cities for the 2026 FIFA World Cup.

Rivalries

While a number of cities and teams have rivalries with Boston, regional proximity has made Boston intense rivals with New York. Teams in Boston and New York offer some of the best rivalries in their respective sports. However, none are more famous than the longtime feud between the Boston Red Sox and New York Yankees in Major League Baseball. The viciousness and fierceness of the rivalry has led to the New York – Boston rivalry being evident between the Patriots and the Jets in the National Football League and the Celtics and the Knicks and the Celtics with the Brooklyn Nets in the National Basketball Association. The second-oldest rivalry in Boston sports is the one between the Bruins and their archrival, the Montreal Canadiens, which began in 1924 and often has been as intense as the Sox-Yankees rivalry for Boston sports fans.

In addition to the Bruins-Canadiens ice hockey rivalry, the B's often clash with the Philadelphia Flyers, Buffalo Sabres, Toronto Maple Leafs, Pittsburgh Penguins and have a history with the Carolina Hurricanes due to the franchise having formerly been known as the Hartford Whalers and located in Hartford, Connecticut. The Bruins have also been longtime rivals with the New York Rangers due to the fact that both teams are members of the NHL's Original Six franchises, a group that also includes the Maple Leafs and Canadiens.

The rivalry between the Celtics and the Los Angeles Lakers is the most storied in the Association as the two teams have met in the NBA Finals 12 times and together account for a total of 34 NBA championships, more than half the total number of championships in the league. The Celtics also have rivalries with the Philadelphia 76ers (considered by many to be the NBA's second greatest rivalry after Celtics-Lakers), especially during the 1960s when centers Bill Russell and Wilt Chamberlain battled for supremacy, the New York Knicks, and the Detroit Pistons, particularly during the late 1980s when the Pistons were about to supplant the Celtics as the best team in the NBA Eastern Conference.

See also 
 Sports in Massachusetts
 The Sports Museum
 U.S. cities with teams from four major sports
 Multiple major sports championship seasons
 Timeline of Boston (includes sports events)

References

External links